The Tailor (original title Terzi) is an upcoming Turkish series starring Çağatay Ulusoy, 
Salih Bademci, Sifanur Gul and Olgun Simsek.The series is produced by OGM pictures and directed by Cem Karci. The series is set to air in 2022 on Netflix.

Cast
 Cagatay Ulusoy - Peyami
 Şifanur Gül - Esvet
 Salih Bademci - Dimitri
 Olgun Şimşek - Mustafa
 Ece Sükan - Suzi
 Evrim Alasya
 Engin Senkan
 Berrak Tüzünataç - Cemre

Plot
Peyami is a famous tailor. When his grandfather dies he comes to Istanbul along with his father Mustafa who is mentally sick having a child like intelligence. For Peyami even the existence of his father has been a shame to him. The series tells the story of his difficult life where he  falls in love with his client, a bride-to-be, whose wedding dress he is hired to sew. .

Production

Development
In the early 2021, it was reported that a new script was getting written specifically for Cagatay Ulusoy. On his birthday in September, it was reported that the show was going to be titled Yali Capkani. After few days, it was reported that Ulusoy didn't like the script and therefore the project was shelved. Then journalist Ranini reported that a new script from the same company was liked by Cagatay and then the contract was signed and show's name became Suslu Korkuluk which when translated to English means Fancy Scarecrow. From a new footage from filming, its revealed that the name of series was changed to Terzi, which when translated to English, means Tailor.Rana Mamatlıoğlu and Bekir Baran Sıtkı are the scriptwriters of the show.

Casting
Cagatay Ulusoy was the first actor whose name was announced with the series. Alina Boz and Hafsanur Sancaktutan names were mentioned and was said that they were interviewed by the director. On Jan 5 singer Ayaz Tezcan himself announced that he will be a part of the show. Actress Beste kanar joined the show as well on the same date. Alina Boz was confirmed to be the leading actress. However when the show was transferred from TV8 to Netflix Alina Boz withdrew her name. 

Esra Bilgiç was then cast alongside Cagatay Ulusoy. On April 1, it was reported that Bilgiç had left the project, and she posted a statement on her Instagram page on April 3 conforming her departure.Journalist of Turkey's largest newspaper Hürriyet wrote that Esra Bilgiç caused problems to the filming crew and asked for a raise twice before the filming began. As a result she was fired from the set.However the same night Esra posted a story saying that she couldn't sign a contract where she couldn't agree to the work conditions and made a decision to leave the show because of the exclusivity contract which prevented her to work on series other than produced by Netflix One of the journalists came in her support and said that the producer was ready to pay her thrice but she chose honor instead of money. No statement came from the production company OGM or Netflix about the incident. 

Finally the producers of the show chose Şifanur Gül for the leading actress. This role serves as the first leading role for the actress after playing minor and supporting roles in series such as The Red Room, Glass Ceilings and As the Crow flies.
Olgun Simsek was cast to play the role of Cagatay's father who has a child like intelligence. For the role of the antagonist Dmitry Fatih Artman and Salih Bademci were interviewed. However Salih Bademci earlier refused but when the show got shifted to Netflix the role was agreed with him. The name of Cagatay Ulusoy's character in the show was announced as Peyami while the name of the character of the female lead was Esvet. The child actor Emir Ali Dogrul was also cast in the series. Cagatay Ulusoy and Emir had earlier worked together in the Netflix film Paper Lives. 
Ece Sukan who is dubbed as "Turkish street style star" joined the cast as Suzi who acts as Cagatay Ulusoy's character Peyami's right hand. Engin Senkan will portray Peyami's grandfather. Evrim Alasya was a surprise name in the series who joined the show near the finale of season one. Berrak Tüzünataç was the surprise name of the second season and was said to fall in the lives of Peyami and Esvet. Berrak had to leave the show O Kiz/ The Girl which was earlier called My Dreams,My Father and I/ Hayallerim,Babam be Ben
to be the part of the show in season 3 which was scheduled to start shooting immediately after the end of filming of season 2

Teaser release
On the eve of 2022 New year the first teaser of the trailer was released. It was first shown on TV8's New year special O Ses Turkiye Programme. The teaser made it clear that Cagatay is going to play the role of a designer in the series. No other actors were shown in the teaser. Director Cem Karci came from Barcelona to shoot it and went back the next day after shooting it. The teaser shows Cagatay Ulusoy dressing up a scarecrow. After a few days as the show got shifted to Netflix it was deleted from TV8's website where it was supposed to air earlier but is still available to watch on YouTube after searching Suslu Korkuluk (former name of the show).

Release controversy
The show was earlier supposed to be aired on TV8. However after few days of the release of the teaser the information about the show disappeared from the website. It was announced by journalists that the budget of the show exceeded and the channel couldn't afford it. It was then announced that the series will air on Disney Plus along with the opening of the platform in Turkey but then Netflix bought the broadcasting rights of the series.

Filming
Filming of the show began on 29 March 2022 in Kirklareli. The place was chosen to shoot the flashback scenes. The area is also the place where Cagatay Ulusoy had earlier shot his short film Birdie and also where he had given a guest appearance as himself in the series Menajerimi Ara.The municipality of Kadikoy informed that the shooting of the series is taking place in the district in the Kadıköy Yoğurtçu Parkı in a special closed set During the filming of one of the action scenes in the car the camera mounted on the top of it came off and Cagatay Ulusoy survived the accident as it fell on the road. If the camera broke through the glass Cagatay would have suffered serious injuries. Cagatay was one of the owners of the company which provided the camera for 500,000 Liras. Despite the financial loss the actor didn't say anything to the crew. However later his girlfriend refuted the claims of the accident.

Filming of the three seasons of the series was taking place in one block.
The filming of the first season concluded on 15 June and the second season began filming in the beginning of July. The filming of the second season concluded on 20 August and the crew started shooting for the third immediately after.

References

External links
 

2022 Turkish television series debuts
Turkish drama television series
Turkish-language Netflix original programming